Dunking may refer to:

 Dunking (biscuit), dipping a biscuit or other food in a liquid
 Performing a slam dunk in basketball
 Dunking, a medieval punishment using a cucking stool